"Pestilence" is the third episode of the first season of the TV series Medici: Masters of Florence, directed by Christian Duguay and Sergio Mimica-Gezzan. It got 6.73 million viewers in Italy.

Summary
Florence is hit by the Black Plague and Cosimo moves the family to the safety of their estate outside the city. Albizzi turns the people against Cosimo and his dome blaming the plague on God's wrath at the Medici's usury. Cosimo returns to Florence and turns the cathedral into a hospice for plague victims to save the dome. Lorenzo overrules Contessina and sells the family's wool business making their financial problems public. Albizzi has Cosimo arrested after Marco breaks into a house to gather evidence on Giovanni's murder. Twenty years earlier, Cosimo and Contessina struggle to trust each other and make their marriage work.

Cast

References

External links
 

2016 British television episodes
Television episodes set in Italy
Television episodes directed by Sergio Mimica-Gezzan
Television episodes written by Frank Spotnitz
Television episodes written by Nicholas Meyer
Drama television episodes
Alternate history television episodes